Acyloins or α-hydroxy ketones are a class of organic compounds which all possess a hydroxy group adjacent to a ketone group. The name acyloin is derived from the fact that they are formally derived from reductive coupling of carboxylic acyl groups.

Synthesis 
Classic organic reactions exist for the synthesis of acyloins. 
 The acyloin condensation is a reductive coupling of esters
 The benzoin condensation is condensation reaction between aldehydes catalyzed by a nucleophile
 Oxidation of carbonyls is possible with molecular oxygen but not selective
 Better alternative is oxidation of corresponding silyl enol ethers with mCPBA in the Rubottom oxidation
 MoOPH oxidation of carbonyls is a system with molybdenum peroxide, pyridine and hexamethylphosphoramide.

Enolate oxidation by sulfonyloxaziridines 
Enolates can be oxidized by sulfonyloxaziridines. The enolate reacts by nucleophilic displacement at the electron deficient oxygen of the oxaziridine ring.

 
This reaction type is extended to asymmetric synthesis by the use of chiral oxaziridines derived from camphor (camphorsulfonyl oxaziridine). Each isomer gives exclusive access to one of the two possible enantiomers. This modification is applied in the Holton taxol total synthesis.

In the enolate oxidation of the cyclopentaenone below with either camphor enantiomer, the trans isomer is obtained because access for the hydroxyl group in the cis position is limited. The use of the standard oxaziridine did not result in an acyloin.

Reactions 
 Reduction of acyloins give diols.
 Oxidation of acyloins give diones.
 α-hydroxy ketones give positive Tollens' and  Fehling's test.
 Some acyloins rearrange with positions swapped under the influence of base in the Lobry–de Bruyn–van Ekenstein transformation
 A similar reaction is the so-called Voigt amination where an acyloin reacts with a primary amine and phosphorus pentoxide to an α-keto amine:

 Indole synthesis, compare Bischler–Möhlau

See also 
 Glycolaldehyde, a related molecule equivalent to an acyloin with both R groups as hydrogen (and thus an aldehyde not a ketone)

References 

Functional groups
Hydroxyketones